Hacking Hall is a Grade I listed, early-17th-century house situated at the confluence of the rivers Calder and Ribble in Lancashire, England.

It is thought that J. R. R. Tolkien, author of The Lord of the Rings, may have taken inspiration from the ferry here for the Bucklebury Ferry over the Brandywine river in his book, as it was still operational when Tolkien visited nearby Stonyhurst College.

See also

Grade I listed buildings in Lancashire
Listed buildings in Billington and Langho

References

Houses in Lancashire
Buildings and structures in Ribble Valley
Grade I listed buildings in Lancashire